Chionodes restio is a moth in the family Gelechiidae. It is found in North America, where it has been recorded from south-western British Columbia to California.

The larvae feed on Quercus douglasii, Quercus dumosa and Quercus garryana.

References

Chionodes
Moths described in 1999
Moths of North America